Vamsi is a given name primarily used by Telugu people. Notable people with the name include the following:

Given name
Vamsi Mootha, American scientist
Vamsi Krishna Naidu (born 1982), Indian film screenwriter and director
Vamsi Krishna, Indian film actor
 Vamsi Krishna Kurra MD Physician Scientist

Surname
Krishna Vamsi, Indian film director
Vakkantham Vamsi, Indian writer

See also

Vamsy

Masculine given names
Telugu names